Kadanuumuu ("Big Man" in the Afar language) is the nickname of KSD-VP-1/1, a 3.58-million-year-old partial Australopithecus afarensis fossil discovered in the Afar Region of Ethiopia in 2005 by a team led by Yohannes Haile-Selassie, curator of physical anthropology at the Cleveland Museum of Natural History. Based on skeletal analysis, the fossil is believed to conclusively show that the species was fully bipedal.

At more than five feet in stature, Kadanuumuu is much taller than the famous Lucy fossil of the same species discovered in the 1970s, and is approximately 400,000 years older.  Among other characteristics, Kadanuumuu's scapula (part of the shoulder blade), the oldest discovered to date for a hominid, is comparable to that of modern humans, suggesting that the species was land rather than tree-based.  Not all researchers agree with this conclusion.

See also
 Dawn of Humanity

References

External links
An early Australopithecus afarensis postcranium from Woranso-Mille, Ethiopia -- Original peer-reviewed paper. 
Images of the fossil and its excavation

Australopithecus fossils
Transitional fossils
Afar Region
Neogene fossil record